Special Herbs + Spices Vol. 1 is the third collaborative album released by American rappers MF Doom and MF Grimm, released in 2004 on Grimm's own Day By Day Entertainment label. Unlike their previous works, this CD is solely focused on MF Grimm's rhyming over MF Doom's production. The first ingredient of each song title is a reference to the corresponding track from Doom's Special Herbs series of instrumental albums. The tracks on the album were composed as freestyles by MF Grimm with many being written on the spot prior to recording. This reflects Grimm's past as a prolific and decorated battle rapper. Due to the duo's falling out after the release of this album, it is the last record to be released collaboratively.

The album was released prior to and in promotion of MF Grimm's triple-album American Hunger. The last track, "My Love" was originally slated to be released on American Hunger, but was removed and replaced with the track "Still My Love" due to MF Grimm's beef with MF Doom.

Track listing
All tracks produced by MF Doom

References

MF Grimm albums
MF Doom albums
2004 albums